Martin Fitzgerald is a fictional character on the NBC/DirecTV daytime drama Passions.  Martin was played by Richard Steinmetz from May 14, 2004, to October 3, 2006. William Bumiller had previously played the role in flashbacks from 1999 to 2000.

Storylines
Martin was the husband of Pilar Lopez-Fitzgerald and the two had five children together: Antonio, Luis, Theresa, Miguel and Paloma. One day, Martin suddenly disappeared. Pilar was heartbroken, lit a candle and prayed for his safe return home. Years went by, and Martin was still missing. Pilar remained faithful to his memory.  Luis was convinced Alistair Crane was responsible for Martin's disappearance. Finally in 2004, it was revealed that Martin was alive and well. He and Katherine Crane (who was previously believed to be dead) were living in Mexico under the assumed names Bob and Ellen Wheeler after they had plastic surgery to disguise their appearance. They were neighbors and mentors to Martin's youngest daughter Paloma, whom Pilar had sent to Mexico to live with her sister Maria for financial reasons. Paloma was born right before Martin left Harmony with Katherine; he never got to see his other children grow up; but he did see Paloma grow up.

Martin eventually made his way back to Harmony and found Pilar. Pilar was angered that he had left her for another woman. Martin's defense was that Katherine was being abused and needed to be escorted out of the States. Alistair would have killed her if he had not taken her away. Pilar and Martin decided to reunite and renew their wedding vows. However, Pilar called off the ceremony when Katherine told her that she had slept with Martin the night before. Six months later, Pilar asked Martin for a divorce. Martin has since disappeared from Harmony and was not heard or mentioned since. Since the move to DirecTV, Pilar has mentioned that she gave up on a future with Martin and let him be with Katherine, confirming the (off-screen) reunion of Martin and Katherine.

Source link
soapcentral.com|PS Online
Martin at Soap Central

See also
 Lopez-Fitzgerald family

External links

Passions characters
Television characters introduced in 2004
Male characters in television